Humphreys County High School (HCHS) is a public senior high school in Belzoni, Mississippi, United States and a part of the Humphreys County School District.

The attendance boundary of the school district, and therefore the school's attendance boundary, is all of Humphreys County.

History
After the school integrated racially (sometime around 1970), black students had protested against verbal abuse used against black students by the principal, a white person; white teachers giving failing grades to black students; and the calling of black students "nigger" and "nigra".

See also
 Humphreys Academy, the area private school

References

External links
 

Public high schools in Mississippi
Schools in Humphreys County, Mississippi